The Mamas & the Papas is the self-titled second studio album by the Mamas and the Papas, released in September 1966. The album peaked at number 4 on the US Billboard 200 album chart and number 24 in the UK. The lead off single, "I Saw Her Again", reached number 5 on the US Billboard Hot 100 chart and number 11 in the UK Singles Chart. "Words of Love" was released as the second single in the US peaking at number 5. In the UK, it was released as a double A-side with "Dancing in the Street" (a cover of the 1964 hit by Martha and the Vandellas) and charted at number 47 in the UK.

After John Phillips discovered that group member Michelle Phillips was having an affair with Gene Clark of the Byrds, he fired her from the group on June 4, 1966. In June, a new singer was hired to replace her. Jill Gibson was producer Lou Adler's girlfriend at the time and was already a singer/songwriter who had performed on several Jan and Dean albums.

There has been considerable speculation over the years about which songs, if any, Jill Gibson sings on.  In 2009, dedicated fans Richard Campbell and Greg Russo talked to Gibson herself, and consulted session sheets from the recording of the album.  Their conclusion was that Gibson sings on "Trip, Stumble and Fall," "Dancing Bear," "Strange Young Girls," "I Can't Wait," "Even If I Could,"  and "That Kind of Girl," as well as "Did You Ever Want to Cry" (which turned up on the following album, Deliver); while Michelle Phillips sings on "No Salt on Her Tail," "Words of Love," "My Heart Stood Still," "Dancing in the Street," "I Saw Her Again," and "Once Was a Time I Thought."

The photo already chosen for the album's cover featured Michelle Phillips prominently, so Dunhill had Gibson take a photo posed in exactly the same position as Michelle, and then superimposed the new photo over that of Phillips.  However, the decision was then made to shoot an entirely new picture with the new line-up and to also change the album's title to Crashon Screamon All Fall Down.  Several thousand advance pressings of the album with this cover and title were sent out to radio stations and record distributors, but with the return of Michelle to the group just prior to the LP's general release, the original cover and eponymous title were quickly reinstated. Copies of the rare Crashon pressings are now highly sought after collector's items.

The album was first issued on CD in 1988 (MCAD-31043) and also appears in its entirety on All the Leaves Are Brown, a retrospective compilation of the band's first four albums, with the single versions of "I Saw Her Again" and "Words of Love".

Original track listing
All songs by John Phillips, unless otherwise noted.

Side one
"No Salt on Her Tail" - 2:35
"Trip, Stumble and Fall" (John Phillips, Michelle Gilliam) - 2:35 
"Dancing Bear" - 4:08
"Words of Love" - 2:13
"My Heart Stood Still" (Richard Rodgers, Lorenz Hart) - 1:43
"Dancing in the Street" (Marvin Gaye, William "Mickey" Stevenson, Ivy Jo Hunter) - 3:00

Side two
"I Saw Her Again" (John Phillips, Denny Doherty) - 2:50
"Strange Young Girls" - 2:45
"I Can't Wait" - 2:40
"Even If I Could" - 2:40
"That Kind of Girl" - 2:20
"Once Was a Time I Thought" - 0:58

Personnel
Denny Doherty - vocals
Cass Elliot - vocals
John Phillips - vocals, guitar
Michelle Phillips - vocals
Jill Gibson - vocals
Hal Blaine - drums, percussion
Larry Knechtel - organ, piano
Joe Osborn - bass guitar
"Doctor" Eric Hord - guitar
Tommy Tedesco - guitar
P. F. Sloan - guitar
Peter Pilafian - electric violin
Ray Manzarek - organ, piano on "No Salt on Her Tail"
Technical
Lou Adler - producer
Dayton "Bones" Howe - engineer
Henry Lewy - engineer
Bowen David - assistant engineer
Jimmie Haskell - string arrangement on "I Saw Her Again"
Gene Page - horn arrangement on "My Heart Stood Still"
Guy Webster - photography
George Whiteman - artwork

Chart positions

References

The Mamas and the Papas albums
1966 albums
Albums arranged by Jimmie Haskell
Albums arranged by Gene Page
Albums produced by Lou Adler
Albums recorded at United Western Recorders
Dunhill Records albums